Edward Montagu may refer to:
Edward Montagu, 1st Baron Montagu (died 1361), English peer
Sir Edward Montagu (judge) (c. 1488–1557), English lawyer and judge
Sir Edward Montagu of Boughton (1532–1601/1602) of Boughton House
Edward Montagu, 1st Baron Montagu of Boughton (1560–1644), son of the above
Edward Montagu, 2nd Earl of Manchester (1602–1671),
Edward Montagu, 1st Earl of Sandwich (1625–1672), English landowner, military officer and politician
Edward Montagu, 2nd Earl of Sandwich (1648–1688)
Edward Montagu, 2nd Baron Montagu of Boughton (1616–1684), Baron Montagu of Boughton House
Edward Montagu (died 1665) (c. 1636–1665), English MP for Sandwich
Edward Montagu (1649–1690), English MP for Northamptonshire and Seaford
Edward Montagu (1672–1710), English MP for Chippenham
Edward Montagu, Viscount Hinchingbrooke (1692–1722)
Edward Montagu, 3rd Earl of Sandwich (1670–1729)
Edward Montagu (died 1738) (after 1684–1738), British MP for Northampton
Edward Montagu (1692–1776), British MP for Huntingdon
Edward Wortley Montagu (traveller) (1713–1776), English author and traveller
Sir Edward Wortley Montagu (diplomat) (1678–1761), British diplomat
Edward Hussey-Montagu, 1st Earl Beaulieu (1721–1802), British peer and politician
Edward Montagu (Indian Army officer) (1755–1799)
Edward Montagu, 5th Baron Rokeby (1787–1847)
Edward Montagu, 8th Earl of Sandwich (1839–1916), Conservative politician and author (known as Viscount Hinchingbrooke until 1884)
Edward Douglas-Scott-Montagu, 3rd Baron Montagu of Beaulieu (1926–2015), English politician

See also
Ed Montague (disambiguation)
Edwin Samuel Montagu (1879–1924), British politician